Piretanide is a loop diuretic compound by using a then-new method for introducing cyclic amine residues in an aromatic nucleus in the presence of other aromatically bonded functional groups. Studies of piretanide in rats and dogs in comparison with other high-ceiling diuretics such as furosemide and bumetanide found a more suitable dose/response rate (regression line) and a more favourable sodium/potassium excretion ratio. These findings led eventually to studies in man and finally to the introduction as a saluretic and antihypertensive medication in Germany, France, Italy and other countries.

It was made in 1973, patented in 1974, and approved for medical use in 1981.

Brand names
Brand names include Arelix, Eurelix, Tauliz.

References

Further reading 

 
 

Diuretics
Pyrrolidines
Phenol ethers
Benzoic acids
Carbonic anhydrase inhibitors
NMDA receptor antagonists